Robert George Halverson,  (22 October 1937 – 9 February 2016) was an Australian politician, air force officer and diplomat. He was a member of the House of Representatives from 1984 to 1998, representing the Liberal Party. He was Speaker of the House from 1996 to 1998, and subsequently served as Ambassador to Ireland from 1998 to 2003.

Early life
Halverson was born on 22 October 1937 in Springvale, Victoria. He was the son of Elizabeth Gretta (née Ordner) and Herbert Martinius Halverson. His father worked as an electrician at a meatworks in Footscray. His paternal grandfather Bendik Halverson was a Norwegian sailor who arrived in Australia in the 1870s.

Halverson was educated at Geelong Road Primary School and Footscray Technical College. At the age of 16, as an air force cadet, he was one of four Air Training Corps members chosen to fly to England and meet Sir Winston Churchill. He left school in 1953 and began an apprenticeship as an industrial chemist.

Air force career
Halverson served in the Royal Australian Air Force (RAAF) from 1956 to 1981, attaining the rank of group captain. He enlisted as an airman, but was selected to join the Officer Cadet School where he topped his year. His first posting was to RAAF Base Townsville, where an explosion left him deaf in one ear and ended his ambitions to become a pilot. He was subsequently transferred back to Melbourne where he worked in supply and equipment.

In 1966, Halverson moved to Washington, D.C., in connection with the RAAF's purchase of F-111 fighter jets. He returned to Australia but moved overseas again in 1976, when he was seconded to the British Royal Air Force's RAF Support Command for three years. He was made an Officer of the Order of the British Empire in 1978. Halverson retired from the RAAF in 1981.

Politics
Halverson was elected to federal parliament at the 1984 federal election, winning the Division of Casey for the Liberal Party. He attracted attention in 1989 when he referred to government MP Elizabeth Harvey as "baby" during question time in the House of Representatives. He refused Harvey's call for an apology, stating that it was a gender-neutral term and was not sexist. In 1990, Halverson was appointed Opposition Whip in the House of Representatives under the new party leader John Hewson. He was stripped of the position when his relationship with Hewson broke down after the 1993 election defeat, but regained it in May 1994 when Alexander Downer became leader. He subsequently assumed the title Chief Opposition Whip.

After the Coalition's victory at the 1996 federal election, Halverson was elected Speaker of the House of Representatives. He resigned the position in March 1998 as the Howard government became frustrated at his impartiality in enforcing discipline on both Government and opposition MPs and allowing supplementary questioning of ministers when answers were evasive. He usually wore the Speaker's traditional gown, but without the wig.

Later life
Halverson retired from politics at the 1998 election and was appointed the Australian Ambassador to Ireland and the Holy See, which he remained until 2003 when he was succeeded by John Herron. He died of cancer in 2016.

References

1937 births
2016 deaths
Liberal Party of Australia members of the Parliament of Australia
Members of the Australian House of Representatives for Casey
Members of the Australian House of Representatives
Australian Officers of the Order of the British Empire
Recipients of the Centenary Medal
Royal Australian Air Force officers
Ambassadors of Australia to Ireland
Speakers of the Australian House of Representatives
Ambassadors of Australia to the Holy See
20th-century Australian politicians
Australian people of Norwegian descent
People from Footscray, Victoria